Macedonia competed at the 2012 European Athletics Championships held in Helsinki, Finland, between 27 June to 1 July 2012. 2 competitors, 1 man and 1 woman took part in 2 events.

Results

Men
Track events

Women
Track events

References
 

2012
Nations at the 2012 European Athletics Championships